Chris Hung (born 19 March 1963) is a Taiwanese enka and Hokkien pop singer and television host. Widely known as the "king of Taiwanese pop," he has won five Golden Melody Awards and one Golden Bell Award.

The eldest of three sons born to singer Ang It-hong, Hung's relationship with his father deteriorated to estrangement due to the strict musical training Hung received from Ang, as well as Ang's multiple marriages. At the age of ten, Hung was sent to Japan for further education in music. After Hung's conversion to Christianity, he stopped drinking and reconciled with his father.

Over the course of his career, Hung has worked closely with songwriter , and gained the nickname "King of Taiwanese pop" alongside Jody Chiang, the "Queen of Taiwanese pop." He was invited to perform at the 2004 National Day celebration sponsored by the Chen Shui-bian administration.

References

External links

1963 births
Living people
Taiwanese Hokkien pop singers
Taiwanese singer-songwriters
Taiwanese Christians
Singers from Tokyo
21st-century Taiwanese  male singers
20th-century Taiwanese  male singers
Taiwanese Mandopop singer-songwriters
Enka singers
Japanese-language singers
Taiwanese expatriates in Japan